Yakhya (Yaxya) is a rural locality (a village) in Ishimbayevsky Selsoviet, Salavatsky District, Bashkortostan, Russia. The population was 333 as of 2010. There are 7 streets.

Geography 
Yakhya is located 30 km south of Maloyaz (the district's administrative centre) by road. Radio is the nearest rural locality.

References 

Rural localities in Salavatsky District